Buckland End is an area of Birmingham, England.

References

External links
 1888 Ordnance Survey map of Buckland End

Areas of Birmingham, West Midlands